The Verugas Bridge is a bridge in Peru. It has a height of 253 feet and is 574 feet in length.

History
The first bridge - a wrought iron viaduct - was designed by Leffert L. Buck and completed in January 1873. In March 1889, after a heavy flood, the first bridge collapsed and a second bridge - a cantilever design - also designed by Leffert L. Buck was completed in January 1891. The second bridge was destroyed by another flood in January 1934 and a third bridge was completed by Cleveland Bridge & Engineering Company two years later.

References

Sources

Bridges in Peru